Åsa Tindra Jinder (born 9 October 1963 in Upplands Väsby, Stockholm County, Sweden is a Swedish nyckelharpa player, composer, producer, songwriter, author and lecturer. She has scored album chart successes in Sweden.

She lives in Stockholm. 2006-2017 she lived in Acktjära outside Bollnäs, Hälsingland.

In 1979 she was the youngest person ever to be awarded the title of Riksspelman or National Folk Musician. In 1995 Jinder and vocalist Gunnhild Tvinnereim joined Norwegian/Irish instrumental duo Secret Garden as they won the Eurovision Song Contest with "Nocturne".

Her daughter Little Jinder is a singer.

References

External links
Åsa Jinder's website(in Swedish)

Swedish folk musicians
Swedish composers
Swedish songwriters
Musicians from Stockholm
Nyckelharpa players
Riksspelmän
1963 births
Living people
Swedish women writers
Swedish-language writers
Swedish women composers